Santillana reservoir, also known as Manzanares el Real reservoir ( or embalse de Manzanares el Real), is a body of water along the Manzanares river located in the municipalities of Manzanares el Real and Soto del Real, in the Community of Madrid, in the centre of Spain. It has a maximum surface of 1052 ha, the longest distance between opposites shores reaches , and the total volume of the reservoir is 91 hm³. The first dam was built in 1907, but in 1969 a new and higher dam was built. This new construction was 5 m higher, which allowed the reservoir to have a volume twice as large as before.

The second and present dam, built in a period of 12 months, began its service in 1971.

Belonging to the Canal de Isabel II public company, it regulates the flow of the Manzanares river and an important part of the water supply to the city of Madrid and its surroundings. Smaller rivers Samburiel and Arroyo del Mediano also flow into the reservoir, which is part of the natural protected area called Parque Regional de la Cuenca Alta del Manzanares. It is also part of the Site of Community Importance (SCI) Manzanares basin, with code ES3110004.

Gallery

References

External links 

State of the Embalse de Santillana
Virtual flight over the reservoir and its shire

Reservoirs in the Community of Madrid
Dams on the Tagus